Peter was a medieval Roman noble. Like his father, he carried the illustrious title of Romanorum patricius, consul, dux et senator ("Patrician, consul, duke, and senator of the Romans"), implying his secular command over Rome and its militia. He was the son of Alberic III, Count of Tusculum. As a result, he was a descendant of Theophylact I, Count of Tusculum.

Historians use the term Saeculum obscurum to describe the period when the Papacy was under the direct control of the Roman nobility, in particular when it was under the domination of the family of Theophylact, which later became the Colonna family

Family tree

Further reading
 George L. Williams. Papal Genealogy: The Families And Descendants Of The Popes

People of medieval Rome
11th-century Italian nobility